
Year 907 (CMVII) was a common year starting on Thursday (link will display the full calendar) of the Julian calendar.

Events 
 By place 

 Byzantine Empire 
  Rus'–Byzantine War: Varangian prince Oleg of Novgorod leads the Kievan Rus' in a campaign against Constantinople, concluded by the Rus'–Byzantine Treaty (in which the city of Chernihiv in Ukraine is first mentioned). He lays siege to the Byzantine capital with some 2,000 ships (dugout boats), and secures trading rights from the world's leading center of commerce.

 Europe 
 July 4–6 – Battle of Pressburg: At "Brezalauspurc" (probably modern-day Bratislava in Slovakia), the advancing East Frankish army (60,000 men) is annihilated by the Hungarians led by Grand Prince Árpád. Duke Luitpold and Archbishop Dietmar I are killed, together with 19 dukes, 2 bishops and 3 abbots. The East Frankish Kingdom loses control of the March of Pannonia.
 Summer – The Hungarians invade Bavaria, causing great destruction, occupying many towns and, on their way home, defeating a Bavarian army at Lengenfeld. The Hungarian-Bavarian border is fixed on the Enns River.

 Britain 
 Lady Æthelflæd of Mercia refortifies Chester against Viking attacks. King Edward the Elder founds Romsey Abbey (Hampshire).

 Arabian Empire 
 Emir Isma'il ibn Ahmad dies after a 15-year reign in which he has extended his borders to Tabaristan and Khorasan. He establishes independence throughout the eastern part of his empire from his capital at Bukhara. Isma'il is succeeded by his son Ahmad Samani as ruler of the Samanid Empire.

 China 
 The Five Dynasties and Ten Kingdoms period begins in China.
 February 27 – Abaoji, ruler (khagan) of the confederation of Khitans, proclaims himself emperor and establishes the Liao dynasty, killing most of the other Khitan chieftains. He occupies territories along China's northern border including parts of Hebei and Shanxi provinces.
 May 12
 The short-lived Qi Kingdom is founded by the warlord Li Maozhen (Prince of Qi). His power is centered in Shaanxi province, in Northwest China. The Tang dynasty comes to an end after 289 years as Emperor Ai is forced to abdicate by chancellor Zhu Quanzhong. 
 The short-lived Wu Kingdom is founded by Yang Wo (Prince of Hongnong) in Jiangdu (South Central China). He refuses to acknowledge the rule of Zhu Quanzhong.
 June 1 – Zhu Quanzhong (Zhu Wen) usurps the throne and proclaims himself the first emperor of Later Liang. China is controlled by successive short-lived kingdoms (until 960). 
 June 8 – The Chu Kingdom is founded by the warlord Ma Yin (Prince of Chu) in Changsha. Present-day Hunan and Guangxi provinces (Southern China) are under his control.
 November 3 – The Former Shu Kingdom is founded by the warlord Wang Jian (Prince of Shu) in Chengdu. His power is centered in Sichuan province, in Southwest China.
 December 1 – The Wuyue Kingdom is founded by the warlord Qian Liu in Hangzhou. His proclaims himself king, his power is centered in Jiangsu province (Eastern China).

 By topic 

 Religion 
 February 1 – Nicholas I Mystikos is deposed as Patriarch of Constanstinople, (having fallen out with the Byzantine Emperor Leo VI), and is replaced by Euthymius I Syncellus.

Births 
 November 26 – Rudesind, Galician bishop (d. 977)
 Bertha of Swabia, Frankish queen (approximate date)
 Parantaka I, ruler of the Chola Kingdom (India) 
 Robert of Vermandois, Frankish nobleman (approximate date)
 Wenceslaus I, duke of Bohemia (approximate date)

Deaths 
 May 2 – Boris I, ruler (knyaz) of the Bulgarian Empire
 July 4
 Dietmar I, archbishop of Salzburg
 Luitpold, margrave of Bavaria
 Alan I, duke ('king') of Brittany
 Árpád, Grand Prince of the Hungarians (approximate date)
 Herbert I, Frankish nobleman
 Isma'il ibn Ahmad, emir of the Samanid Empire
 Radelchis II, Lombard prince 
 Rudesind I, bishop of Dumium (Spain)

References